Duplicity is the error committed when the charge (known as a count) on an indictment describes two different offences.

An indictment may contain more than one count, but each count must allege only one offence, so that the defendant (and the jury) can know precisely what offences he or she is accused of. If a count is poorly drafted so that it alleges two offences, it is said to be "duplicitous". A duplicitous count is defective and must be quashed by the judge, unless the judge permits the count to be amended so that it only alleges one offence, or is split into two counts. If a duplicitous count is not noticed until after the defendant has been convicted on it, the verdict may be void.

Duplicity is a completely different situation from when two different counts each allege the same offence, which is known as multiplicity, but sometimes wrongly referred to as duplicity.

References	
Archbold, Criminal Pleading, Evidence and Practice (Sweet & Maxwell: 2010), 1-135 to 1-146

Legal terminology
Criminal law